Leander Paes and David Rikl were the defending champions but only Paes competed that year with Jonas Björkman.

Björkman and Paes lost in the final 6–2, 4–6, 6–4 against Mahesh Bhupathi and Fabrice Santoro.

Seeds

  Mahesh Bhupathi /  Fabrice Santoro (champions)
  Jonas Björkman /  Leander Paes (final)
  Mark Knowles /  Daniel Nestor (first round)
  Martin Damm /  Cyril Suk (first round)

Draw

References
 2004 Dubai Tennis Championships Men's Doubles Draw

2004 Dubai Tennis Championships
Doubles